Graham Jessop (5 June 1957 – 1 November 2012) was a British commercial diver and marine archaeologist who has taken part in a number of important expeditions such as the 1999 discovery of the remains of the  off the coast of Ireland. Jessop subsequently purchased the Carpathia, so as to control access and protect it from private scavengers.

In 2000, RMS Titanic Inc. named Jessop as the recovery manager of the wreck of the Titanic.

He was born in Yorkshire and died from cancer.

Notes 

1957 births
2012 deaths
English archaeologists
English underwater divers
Professional divers